Obadiah Wheelock III (7 July 1738 – Mendon, Massachusetts – 7 January 1807 Annapolis, Nova Scotia) was a political figure in Nova Scotia. He represented Annapolis Township in the Nova Scotia House of Assembly from 1770 to 1774.

Life 
He was born in Mendon, Massachusetts and came to Annapolis, Nova Scotia in 1760.  He was unseated for non-attendance in 1774.

Family 
Obadiah Wheelock III was a second cousin, once removed, of Eleazar Wheelock, founder of Dartmouth College.  Put another way, his paternal great-great-grandparents, Ralph Wheelock (1600–1684) and Rebecca Clarke (1610–1680), were also the great-grandparents of Eleazar Wheelock. Obadiah's third cousin (Eleazar's son), John Wheelock, was Dartmouth's founding president.

References 

1738 births
1807 deaths
Nova Scotia pre-Confederation MLAs
People from Mendon, Massachusetts
Ralph Wheelock family